Maria Chapdelaine is a Canadian drama film, directed by Sébastien Pilote and scheduled for release on September 24, 2021. An adaptation of Louis Hémon's 1913 novel Maria Chapdelaine, the film stars Sara Montpetit as the titular Maria Chapdelaine, a young woman in rural Péribonka, Quebec, who is torn between three suitors: François Paradis (Émile Schneider), a coureur de bois; Eutrope Gagnon (Antoine Olivier Pilon), a local farmer; and Lorenzo Surprenant (Robert Naylor), a wealthy man who offers the promise of life in the United States.

The cast also includes Sébastien Ricard and Hélène Florent as Maria's parents Samuel and Laura Chapdelaine, as well as Gilbert Sicotte, Gabriel Arcand, Danny Gilmore, Martin Dubreuil, Arno Lemay, Charlotte St-Martin,  Thomas Haché, Henri Picard and Xavier Rivard-Désy.

Production commenced in February 2020 in the Saguenay–Lac-Saint-Jean region. It was shut down in March by the COVID-19 pandemic in Canada, but resumed in August.

The film was originally slated for theatrical release on December 18, 2020, in Canada, but the release was postponed to 2021. It premiered at the 2021 Toronto International Film Festival, in advance of its commercial release on September 24.

Synopsis 
Maria Chapdelaine is a young sixteen-year-old girl who lives with her family on the shores of the Peribonka River in rural Quebec in the 1910s. The Chapdelaine family works tirelessly to push the limits of the forest. Where the harshness of everyday life meets the delicacy of a warm family life, the strong and hopeful Maria finds herself faced with daunting dilemmas. Between tradition, territory, family and love, young Maria is pushed into the real world and will suddenly have to choose her future as a woman.

Reception
The film was named to TIFF's annual year-end Canada's Top Ten list for 2021.

Awards

References

External links

2020s historical drama films
Films directed by Sébastien Pilote
2020s French-language films
Films based on Canadian novels
Saguenay–Lac-Saint-Jean in fiction
Canadian historical drama films
French-language Canadian films
2020s Canadian films